In professional wrestling, championships are competed for in scripted storylines by a company or promotion's roster of contracted wrestlers. WWE is a Stamford, Connecticut-based company primarily focused on professional wrestling. The promotion was founded in 1953 as the Capitol Wrestling Corporation (CWC). In the company's 50-year history, over 40 different unique championships have been operated and contended for. These titles consisted of divisional, special stipulations, and weight-class championships. Of these titles, 30 have been retired and succeeded through replacement titles or title unifications. The first championship retirement occurred in 1961 with the Northeast version of the NWA World Tag Team Championship (created in 1957). The most recent retirement occurred in September 2022 with all four of NXT UK's championships being retired. The following is a compilation of the company's former championships that were once active and contended for by its roster.

History

1953–1969
In 1953, Capitol Wrestling Corporation (CWC) became a member of the National Wrestling Alliance (NWA). During this time, CWC wrestlers could compete for championships operated by the NWA. In 1958, the CWC created the NWA United States Tag Team Championship, which inaugural champions Mark Lewin and Don Curtis won in April of that year. In 1963, CWC ended its partnership with the NWA and established itself as the World Wide Wrestling Federation (WWWF). To reflect the changes, the WWWF introduced its world heavyweight championship (WWE's third overall male singles championship and the current WWE Championship), while the WWWF acronym was added to the United States Tag Team title.  Without a formal explanation by the WWWF, the Tag Team title was disbanded in 1967, the first championship to be retired during the WWWF years. Ten years later, the company retired its first individually contested WWWF-branded title, the WWWF United States Heavyweight Championship, also without a formal explanation.

1970–1999
The WWWF formed a partnership with New Japan Pro-Wrestling (NJPW), Universal Wrestling Federation (UWF), and Universal Wrestling Association (UWA) between the 1970s and 1980s, and as a result, created and lent titles to these promotions. In 1979, the promotion renamed itself to the World Wrestling Federation (WWF) and six years later ended its partnerships with NJPW and UWF. This resulted in the retirement of one UWF and three NJPW lent titles: the WWF International Heavyweight Championship (UWF), WWF Junior Heavyweight Championship, WWF World Martial Arts Heavyweight Championship, and WWF International Tag Team Championship (NJPW). The company also ceased operations of three short-lived titles: the WWF North American Heavyweight Championship (1979–1981), WWF Canadian Championship (1985–1986), and WWF Women's Tag Team Championship (1983–1989). Despite their names, the geographic-name-based titles were not restricted to wrestlers from that location. During the 1990s, the WWF ended its relationship with the UWA; as a result, the WWF Intercontinental Tag Team Championship was abandoned, while the WWF Light Heavyweight Championship (which UWA possessed) was reactivated in the United States for use by the WWF. In 1996, the Million Dollar Championship, a title created by Ted DiBiase, was retired, although it was never sanctioned by the WWF, but was reintroduced briefly in 2010 by Ted DiBiase Jr., and again in 2021 as part of a storyline in NXT.

2000–2015
In March 2001, the WWF acquired all assets of World Championship Wrestling (WCW), including its championships. Of these titles, the WWF operated the WCW World Heavyweight, World Tag Team, and Cruiserweight championships. In late 2001, the WWF discontinued the WCW World Heavyweight and Tag Team Championships (which were unified with WWF's world and tag team championships, respectively), while the WWF Light Heavyweight Championship was retired in favor of the Cruiserweight, which would also be retired in 2007. In 2002, WWF was renamed to World Wrestling Entertainment (WWE), and during this year, WWE discontinued the WWE Hardcore and European Championships after they were unified with the WWE Intercontinental Championship.

WWE also acquired all assets of Extreme Championship Wrestling (ECW) in 2003, and implemented the ECW brand in 2006, along with the reactivated ECW World Heavyweight Championship; however, when the brand closed in 2010, the title was retired after Ezekiel Jackson became the last champion on the final episode of the ECW on Syfy series. The World Tag Team Championship, established in 1971, and WWE Tag Team Championship, introduced in 2002, were unified on April 9, 2009, maintaining separate title histories as the "Unified WWE Tag Team Championship". However, on August 16, 2010, the older title was retired in favor of keeping the newer title as the sole tag team championship contended for in WWE. The champions, The Hart Dynasty (David Hart Smith and Tyson Kidd) were awarded a new set of belts that represented the 2002 championship, and were thus recognized as the final holders of the original World Tag Team Championship.

The original WWE Women's Championship, established in 1956, and the WWE Divas Championship, introduced in 2008, were unified on September 19, 2010, maintaining the title history of the Divas Championship. The older title was retired in favor of keeping the newer title as the sole championship contended for in WWE by the Divas. The self-professed co-Women's Champion Michelle McCool defeated Divas Champion Melina at Night of Champions to become the unified champion, thus making Layla the final holder of the Women's Championship. On April 3, 2016, at WrestleMania 32, Divas Champion Charlotte was originally scheduled to defend her title in a triple-threat match. At the event, however, the Divas Championship was replaced with a new WWE Women's Championship, with the winner of the triple-threat match becoming the inaugural champion, thus Charlotte was the final holder of the Divas Championship.

The World Heavyweight Championship was established in 2002 as a second world championship in WWE during the time of the first brand extension. During this period, the World Heavyweight Championship would be the primary championship for either the Raw or SmackDown brand, with the WWE Championship on the other. The brand extension ended in 2011, allowing both championships to appear on both shows. On December 15, 2013, World Heavyweight Champion John Cena faced WWE Champion Randy Orton in a match at TLC: Tables, Ladders & Chairs, where the World Heavyweight Championship was unified with the WWE Championship as Orton defeated Cena. At the event, it was announced that the unified titles would be called the "WWE World Heavyweight Championship", retaining the lineage of the WWE Championship. WWE officially recognized Orton as the final World Heavyweight Champion and retired the title.

2016–present
In 2016, WWE reintroduced the brand extension. Shortly after, the cruiserweight division was revived and a new WWE Cruiserweight Championship was established. This newer title did not carry the lineage of the original Cruiserweight Championship that was retired in 2007. The title was originally exclusive to the Raw brand before it became exclusive to the 205 Live brand in 2018. It then also became part of NXT after 205 Live merged under NXT in October 2019. It was subsequently renamed the NXT Cruiserweight Championship and was then extended to the NXT UK brand in January 2020. However, in January 2022, the championship was retired. At the New Year's Evil special episode of NXT 2.0 on January 4, 2022, the title was unified into the NXT North American Championship. North American Champion Carmelo Hayes defeated Cruiserweight Champion Roderick Strong, with Hayes recognized as the final Cruiserweight Champion and going forward as North American Champion.

In December 2016, WWE announced that they would be establishing a new United Kingdom-based brand and the first championship created for the brand was the WWE United Kingdom Championship. In June 2018, the brand was formally established as NXT UK, and the NXT UK Women's Championship and NXT UK Tag Team Championship were created at that time. In early 2020, the WWE United Kingdom Championship was renamed as the NXT United Kingdom Championship, and later that year, the NXT UK Heritage Cup was established. In August 2022, WWE announced that the NXT UK brand would be going on hiatus following the Worlds Collide event on September 4, 2022, and the brand would relaunch as NXT Europe in 2023. As such, all of NXT UK's championships were unified into their respective NXT championship counterparts, except for the NXT UK Heritage Cup, which was quietly retired without a formal announcement. The NXT United Kingdom Championship, NXT UK Women's Championship, and NXT UK Tag Team Championship were unified into the NXT Championship, NXT Women's Championship, and NXT Tag Team Championship, respectively, with Tyler Bate, Meiko Satomura, and the team of Brooks Jensen and Josh Briggs recognized as the final champions of each.

In May 2019, WWE introduced the WWE 24/7 Championship, a title similar to the company's former Hardcore Championship. The title had a "24/7" rule in which it could be defended anytime, anywhere, as long as a WWE referee was present. Due to this rule, it was available to all of WWE's brands and could be won by both men and women as well as non-WWE employees. After Nikki Cross won the championship on the November 7, 2022, episode of Raw, she discarded the title near a trash can backstage and two days later, the championship was listed as inactive on WWE.com.

Defunct championships 
World championship recognition in bold.

Men

Singles championships

Tag team championships

Women

Singles championships

Tag team championships

Unisex

Singles championships

Other championships previously used by WWE

See also 
List of current champions in WWE

Footnotes

A: – The title was officially abandoned by the WWF in 1989, though the physical belt was revived by NJPW to represent its Greatest 18 Club Championship, that championship was discontinued by NJPW in 1992.
B: – This is the date the WWF acquired WCW, in which WCW's assets were also acquired by WWF, including its titles.
C: – The first title holder in the WWF as a part of The Invasion storyline.
D: – This is the date the WWF began operating the title in the United States; the championship had been active since March 26, 1981 being used by the WWF's partners the UWA and NJPW.
E: – This is the date WWE launched the ECW program, during which Rob Van Dam was awarded the title as a result of winning the WWE Championship on June 11, 2006. 
F: - This is the date upon which WWE consolidated the unification of both its tag team championships, and continued to recognize only one championship to be contended in its tag team division.

References

Further reading

External links
WWE Official website
WWE retired championship histories
Wrestling-Titles.com: WWE

WWE championships lists